The Nike Summer League is a defunct pre-season collegiate basketball tournament in the Philippines sponsored by Nike. Its first season started in 2006. The tournament was last held in 2009. Games were telecast on TV by Studio 23.

Participating Schools
 UAAP
 Adamson University Soaring Falcons
 Ateneo de Manila University Blue Eagles
 De La Salle University-Manila Green Archers
 Far Eastern University Tamaraws
 National University Bulldogs
 University of the East Red Warriors
 University of the Philippines Fighting Maroons
 University of Santo Tomas Growling Tigers
 NCAA
 De La Salle-College of Saint Benilde Blazers
 Colegio de San Juan de Letran Knights
 Jose Rizal University Heavy Bombers
 Mapua Institute of Technology Cardinals
 Philippine Christian University Dolphins
 San Beda College Red Lions
 San Sebastian College - Recoletos Stags
 University of Perpetual Help System Dalta Altas
 NCAA South
 Don Bosco Technical College Grey Wolves
 Philippine Christian University-Dasmariñas Dolphins
 San Beda College-Alabang Red Lions
 NCRAA
 De La Salle University-Dasmariñas Patriots
 Emilio Aguinaldo College Generals
 Olivarez College Sea Lions
 Polytechnic University of the Philippines Maroons
 CUSA
 Philippine College of Criminology Enforcers
 PMI Colleges Admirals
 Other Leagues
 STI College Santa Rosa Olympians
 Ateneo de Zamboanga University Blue Eagles
 FEATI University Seahawks
 Lyceum of the Philippines University Pirates
 Manila Doctors College

Tournament Format
Its format consists of dividing the teams into 4 groups, in which a single round robin is played against other teams of the same group to determine the quarter finalists. The top two teams from each group comprise the 8 quarter finalists. A knockout game is played between the top seed of group A and the lower seed of Group D and vice versa. The same happens between group B and C quarter finalists. The tournament goes on until 1 team becomes champion.

2006 season

Playoffs

Awards

2007 season

Standings

Group A

Group B

Group C

Group D

Playoffs
{{8TeamBracket
| RD1-seed1=A1
| RD1-team1=FEU| RD1-score1=92| RD1-seed2=D2
| RD1-team2=Adamson 
| RD1-score2=71
| RD1-seed3=D1
| RD1-team3=Letran
| RD1-score3=79
| RD1-seed4=A2| RD1-team4=Mapúa| RD1-score4=87| RD1-seed5=C1
| RD1-team5=San Sebastian 
| RD1-score5=79
| RD1-seed6=B2| RD1-team6=UE| RD1-score6=101| RD1-seed7=B1| RD1-team7=La Salle| RD1-score7=101| RD1-seed8=C2
| RD1-team8=FEATI
| RD1-score8=85
| RD2-seed1=A1| RD2-team1=FEU| RD2-score1=78| RD2-seed2=A2
| RD2-team2=Mapua
| RD2-score2=68
| RD2-seed3=B2
| RD2-team3=UE
| RD2-score3=70
| RD2-seed4=B1| RD2-team4=La Salle| RD2-score4=73| RD3-seed1=A1
| RD3-team1=FEU
| RD3-score1=83
| RD3-seed2=B1| RD3-team2=La Salle| RD3-score2=88}}

Awards

 Tournament MVP: Rico Maierhofer (La Salle)
 Mythical Five:
 Guard: TY Tang (La Salle)
 Guard: Marcy Arellano (UE)
 Forward: Neil Pascual (Mapúa)
 Forward: Mac Baracael  (FEU)
 Center: Rico Maierhofer (La Salle)

2008 season

Team Standings

Group A

Group B

Group C

Group D

Playoffs

Awards

 Tournament MVP: Eric Salamat (Ateneo)
 Mythical Five:
 Guard: Eric Salamat (Ateneo)
 Guard: Mark Barocca (FEU)
 Forward: PJ Barua (La Salle)
 Forward: Rico Maierhofer (La Salle)
 Center: Pari Llagas (UE)

2009 season

Team Standings

Group A

Group B

Group C

Group D

Playoffs

Awards

 Tournament MVP: Sudan Daniel (San Beda)
 Mythical Five:
 Guard: Ryan Roose Garcia (FEU)
 Guard: J.R. Tecson (San Beda)
 Forward: Jimbo Aquino (San Sebastian)
 Forward: Reymar Gutilban (Letran)
 Center: Sudan Daniels''' (San Beda)

References

External links
  (archived, 3 Nov 2008)

College men's basketball competitions in the Philippines
Nike, Inc.
2006 establishments in the Philippines
2009 disestablishments in the Philippines
Sports leagues established in 2006
Sports leagues disestablished in 2009